Fujioka (written: 藤岡) is a Japanese surname. Notable people with the surname include:

, Japanese actor
, Japanese actor
, Japanese video game designer and composer
Dean Fujioka (born 1980), Japanese musician and actor
, Japanese actor
John Fujioka (1925–2018), American actor
, Japanese women's basketball player
, Japanese professor of education at Tokyo University
, Japanese potter
, Japanese baseball player
William T. Fujioka (born 1953), American county executive
, Japanese baseball player
, Japanese baseball player

Fictional characters
, a character in the manga series Minami-ke
, a character in the manga series Ouran High School Host Club

Japanese-language surnames